Henry and Alice Gennett House, also known as The Gennett Mansion, is a historic home located at Richmond, Wayne County, Indiana.  It was built in 1898, and is a large two-story, Colonial Revival style yellow ceramic brick dwelling, with small projecting porches or wings on each side.  It sits on a limestone foundation and has a hipped roof.  It features a two-story entrance portico with Ionic order columns surmounted by a semi-circular bay.

It was listed on the National Register of Historic Places in 1983. It is located in the East Main Street-Glen Miller Park Historic District.

References

Houses on the National Register of Historic Places in Indiana
Colonial Revival architecture in Indiana
Houses completed in 1900
Buildings and structures in Richmond, Indiana
National Register of Historic Places in Wayne County, Indiana
Historic district contributing properties in Indiana